Trinidad and Tobago have competed at all but two Commonwealth Games since their debut in 1934. The only times they did not participate were in 1950 and 1986.

Medals

References

 
Nations at the Commonwealth Games